For a Just Kazakhstan (also known as For a Fair Kazakhstan) (Ädılettı Qazaqstan Üşin) is a political bloc that was founded by the Communist Party of Kazakhstan, the Naghyz Ak Zhol and the Democratic Choice of Kazakhstan as an opposition coalition to nominate a single candidate in the 2005 presidential elections.

The movement was led by Zharmakhan Tuyakbay, the former chair of the Mazhilis and the deputy chairman of Otan. Tuyakbay resigned from his parliamentary post after 2004 legislative election citing widespread irregularities and election fraud. He joined the loose opposition bloc and became the coalition's candidate for the presidential elections. After the elections, he founded the Nationwide Social Democratic Party in September 2006.

For a Just Kazakhstan advocates democratization of the political system, election of regional governors, investigation of corruption cases involving the family of the president Nursultan Nazarbayev and the fair redistribution of national wealth.

References

Political movements in Kazakhstan
Organizations established in 2005
2005 establishments in Kazakhstan
Political party alliances in Kazakhstan